Alessandro Martucci (16th century) was an Italian painter of the Renaissance period, active near his natal city of Capua. His son, Simio, painted quadratura and died in 1641.

References

People from the Province of Caserta
16th-century Italian painters
Italian male painters
Italian Renaissance painters
Year of death unknown
Year of birth unknown